The women's 500 metre time trial in cycling at the 2004 Summer Olympics was a time trial race in which each of the twelve cyclists attempted to set the fastest time for two laps (500 metres) of the track. 

In a field of personal bests, 20-year-old World Champion for the 500 m time trial, Anna Meares from Australia, set a new world record to claim the gold medal in 33.952 seconds. The previous world record was held by Yonghua Jiang of China, who minutes previously had set a new Olympic record in this event to claim the silver medal with a time of 34.112 seconds. Natallia Tsylinskaya from Belarus was awarded the bronze medal.

Medalists

Records
Anna Meares's time of 33.952 in the event set a new world record, bettering Jiang Yonghua's world record and Félicia Ballanger's Olympic record.

Results

See also
Track time trial
Cycling at the 2004 Summer Olympics – Men's track time trial
Cycling at the 2008 Summer Olympics – Women's BMX

References

External links
Official Olympic Report

W
Cycling at the Summer Olympics – Women's track time trial
Track cycling at the 2004 Summer Olympics
Olymp
Women's events at the 2004 Summer Olympics